Arlee Wararong is a Thai former cyclist. He competed in the individual road race event at the 1976 Summer Olympics.

References

External links
 

Year of birth missing (living people)
Living people
Arlee Wararong
Arlee Wararong
Cyclists at the 1976 Summer Olympics
Place of birth missing (living people)
Arlee Wararong